The Association des Guides du Burkina Faso (AGBF, roughly Guide Association of Burkina Faso) is the national Guiding organization of Burkina Faso. It serves 12,716 members (as of 2003). Founded in 1955, the girls-only organization became an associate member of the World Association of Girl Guides and Girl Scouts in 1972 and a full member in 2002.

See also
Fédération Burkinabé du Scoutisme

References 

World Association of Girl Guides and Girl Scouts member organizations
Scouting and Guiding in Burkina Faso
Youth organizations established in 1955
1955 establishments in French Upper Volta